Mimosa Hall is the name of a plantation house in Leigh, Texas. John J. Webster built Mimosa Hall in 1844. Webster, born in Alabama in 1796, the son of a revolutionary soldier, was an architect. Webster moved to Texas in 1839 with his wife, Miriam Webster, and their children.

History
Enslaved people made all of the bricks and cut all of the lumber on the plantation. The plantation was primarily used for planting.

The family cemetery was on the property adjoining the house.  Nestled two miles (3 km) back in the woods, an old brick wall on the top of a knoll surrounds the cemetery. The original family was all buried there, and their descendants still maintain the cemetery.

The American Museum in Britain has in its permanent collection a quilt made by people enslaved on the Mimosa Hall Plantation. The quilt, c. 1860, is called "The Chalice."

Current
It is registered in the National Register of Historic Places, along with its sister home in nearby Karnack, Texas, which was the birthplace of Lady Bird Johnson. The plantation stayed in the original family until the 1980s when Douglas Blocker sold it. Mimosa Hall was then a bed and breakfast for several years until its owners purchased it to use as a private residence.

See also

National Register of Historic Places listings in Harrison County, Texas

References

External links

Mimosa Hall from the Center for Regional Heritage Research, Stephen F. Austin State University

Houses completed in 1844
Houses on the National Register of Historic Places in Texas
Plantation houses in Texas
Greek Revival houses in Texas
Houses in Harrison County, Texas
National Register of Historic Places in Harrison County, Texas